Aziz Ibragimov (also spelled Ibrahimov, born 21 July 1986) is an Uzbekistani footballer who plays as a defender for Turon Yaypan.

Club career
Ibragimov played for various clubs in his native Uzbekistan, as well as in Slovakia, the Czech Republic, China, Iran and Latvia.

International career
Between 2007 and 2011, he won 17 caps for the Uzbekistan national team, scoring 3 goals, including one at the 2007 AFC Asian Cup.

International goals

References

External links

1986 births
Living people
Uzbekistani footballers
Uzbekistan international footballers
2007 AFC Asian Cup players
Traktor Tashkent players
FC Shurtan Guzar players
FK Mash'al Mubarek players
PFK Nurafshon players
Bohemians 1905 players
FK Baník Most players
SK Dynamo České Budějovice players
FK Bohemians Prague (Střížkov) players
ŠK Slovan Bratislava players
Qingdao Hainiu F.C. (1990) players
FK Andijon players
FK Dinamo Samarqand players
Machine Sazi F.C. players
FK Spartaks Jūrmala players
Navbahor Namangan players
Surkhon Termez players
Czech First League players
Czech National Football League players
Slovak Super Liga players
Chinese Super League players
Persian Gulf Pro League players
Latvian Higher League players
Uzbekistan Super League players
Uzbekistani expatriate footballers
Expatriate footballers in Slovakia
Expatriate footballers in China
Expatriate footballers in Iran
Expatriate footballers in Latvia
Expatriate footballers in the Czech Republic
Uzbekistani expatriate sportspeople in Slovakia
Uzbekistani expatriate sportspeople in the Czech Republic
Uzbekistani expatriate sportspeople in China
Uzbekistani expatriate sportspeople in Iran
Uzbekistani expatriate sportspeople in Latvia
2011 AFC Asian Cup players
Association football defenders